Parliamentary elections were held in Morocco on 3 June 1977. Elections had previously been held in 1970, but Parliament had been dissolved in March 1972 and a new constitution approved in a referendum in the same month. Fresh elections were scheduled for May, but were later indefinitely postponed.

Unlike the previous Parliament, in which only 90 of the 240 members had been directly elected, the new Parliament had 176 directly elected members, 48 elected by colleges of local councillors, and 40 from professional colleges (15 from the Chambers of Agriculture, 10 from the Chamber of Commerce and Industry, 7 from the Chamber of Handicrafts and 8 by representatives of employees' organizations).

A total of 1,022 candidates contested the election; 456 were independents, with the remainder belonging to seven different parties. Ultimately independents won the majority of seats, with a total of 141. Voter turnout was 82.36%.

Results

References

Morocco
1977 in Morocco
Elections in Morocco
June 1977 events in Africa
Election and referendum articles with incomplete results